Durangi is a rural locality (a selo) in Buynaksky District, Republic of Dagestan, Russia. The population was 550 as of 2010. There are 14 streets.

Geography 
Durangi is located 28 km southeast of Buynaksk (the district's administrative centre) by road, on the left bank of the Markisal River. Chabanmakhi and Arykhkent is the nearest rural locality.

References 

Rural localities in Buynaksky District